Angel Garcia may refer to:

Sports
Angel García (sprinter) (1919–1996), Cuban sprinter
Angel García (baseball) (born 1923), Cuban baseball player
Ángel García (basketball, born 1941), basketball player
Ángel García (pole vaulter) (born 1967), Cuban pole vaulter
Ángel García (footballer, born 1976), Mexican football manager and former defender
Angel García (rower) (born 1986), Uruguayan rower
Ángel García (basketball, born 1988), basketball player
Ángel García (footballer, born 1993), Spanish football winger
Ángel García (footballer, born 2000), Mexican football midfielder

Others
Ángel García Peña (1856–1928), Mexican Major General
Ángel García Hernández (1899–1930), Spanish soldier
Ángel García Yáñez (born 1967), Mexican politician
Angelo Garcia (born 1976), Puerto Rican singer and songwriter
Angel García de Jesús, Puerto Rican politician and former mayor of Yabucoa
Angel Garcia, a character in the TV series Mercy 
Angel Garcia, a character in the film Key Largo

See also

 Miguel Ángel García (disambiguation)
 
 Angel (disambiguation)
 Garcia (disambiguation)